Berlin Regional Airport  is an airport located in Milan,  north of the central business district (CBD) of Berlin, a city in Coos County, New Hampshire, United States. It once had scheduled air service via Air Vermont and at one point Northeast Airlines.

It is included in the Federal Aviation Administration (FAA) National Plan of Integrated Airport Systems for 2017–2021, in which it is categorized as a basic general aviation facility.

References

External links 

Airports in New Hampshire
Berlin, New Hampshire
Transportation buildings and structures in Coös County, New Hampshire